Jan Müller (December 27, 1922 – January 29, 1958) was a New York-based figurative expressionist artist of the 1950s. According to art critic Carter Ratcliff, "His paintings usually erect a visual architecture sturdy enough to support an array of standing, riding, levitating figures. Gravity is absent, banished by an indifference to ordinary experience." According to the poet John Ashbery, Müller "brings a medieval sensibility to neo-Expressionist paintings."

Biography
Jan Müller was born on December 27, 1922, in Hamburg, Germany. In 1933 his family fled the Nazis to Prague, and later to Bex-les-Bains, Switzerland; there he experienced the first of several attacks of rheumatic fever. He visited Paris in 1938 and two years later was apprehended and interned in a camp near Lyon.  Shortly after the fall of Paris, Müller was released, at which time he moved to Ornaisons, near Narbonne. Following an unsuccessful attempt to escape to the United States from Marseille, he was able to cross the border into Spain in 1941 and proceed via Portugal to New York.

Jan Müller began to study art in 1945.
 The Art Students League of New York, New York City, for six months
 Hans Hofmann School of Fine Arts for five years
He became a US citizen in 1957.

Jan Müller died on January 29, 1958, at the age of thirty-five, in New York.

Selected solo exhibitions
 1953, 1954, 1955, 1956, 1957, 1958: Cooperative Hansa Gallery, New York City, which he founded with Allan Kaprow and Richard Stankiewicz
  1955, 1956: The Sun Gallery, Provincetown, Massachusetts
 1960: University of Minnesota
 1961: Zabriskie Gallery, NYC
 1962: Jan Müller: 1922–1958 organized by the Solomon R. Guggenheim Museum, NYC
 1970, 1971, 1972: Noah Goldowsky
 1976, 1977: Gruenebaum Gallery, NYC
 1980: Rosa Esman Gallery, NYC

Selected group exhibitions
 1952: 813 Broadway (Gallery), NYC
 1953: The Art Institute of Chicago
 1955: University of Minnesota
 1955, 1956: Stable Show, Annual Exhibition of Painting and Sculpture, Stable Gallery, NYC
 1957: The New York School, Second Generation, Jewish Museum, NYC; Young America, Whitney Museum of American Art, NYC
 1958: Carnegie, Pittsburgh, Pennsylvania; Festival of Two Worlds, Spoleto, Perugia, Italy
  1958, 1959: Institute of Contemporary Art, Boston, MA
 1959: New Images of Man, Museum of Modern Art, NYC
 1960: American Federation of Arts, circ., NYC
 2009: Days Lumberyard Studios, Provincetown, MA, 1915-1972,  ACME Fine Art, Boston, MA;

Collections
 Mint Museum of Art, Charlotte, North Carolina
 Museum of Modern Art, NYC
 Newark Museum, Newark, New Jersey
 Chrysler Museum of Art, Norfolk, VA

See also
New York School
Action painting

References

 Paul Cummings, Dictionary of Contemporary American Artists, (St. Martins Press New York, 1994.) 
 Martica Sawin, "Jan Müller: 1922-1958," Arts, vol. 33, Feb. 1959, pp41, repr.,44

Books
 Paul Schimmel and Judith E Stein, The Figurative fifties : New York figurative expressionism, (Newport Beach, Calif. : Newport Harbor Art Museum : New York : Rizzoli, 1988.)  
 Barbara Rose, American Art Since 1900; a critical history. (New York, F. A. Praeger, 1967.) OCLC: 256107 p. 236, repr., 237
 Irving Sandler, The New York School: The Painters and Sculptors of the Fifties, (New York, Harper & Row, 1978.) ,  p. 124, fig. 86
Marika Herskovic, New York School Abstract Expressionists Artists Choice by Artists, (New York School Press, 2000.)  pp. 32,38
Marika Herskovic, American Abstract and Figurative Expressionism: Style Is Timely Art Is Timeless: An Illustrated Survey With Artists' Statements, Artwork and Biographies. (New York School Press, 2009.) . p. 172-175

1922 births
1958 deaths
American Expressionist painters
20th-century American painters
American male painters
Modern painters
Painters from New York City
German emigrants to the United States
20th-century American male artists